Fındıqlı is a village and municipality in the Zaqatala Rayon of Azerbaijan. It has a population of 590.

References

Populated places in Zaqatala District